Vasloi was a Hasidic dynasty centered in Vaslui, Romania, and founded by Rabbi Shalom Halpern, a grandson of Rabbi Yisroel Friedman of Ruzhyn in the Russian Empire.

History

Reb Shalom Halpern was born on 15 Shevat, 1857, to Rabbi Dovid Halpern of Berdychiv and Leah, a daughter of Rabbi Yisroel Friedman. In 1873, aged 17, Reb Shalom married his cousin Chana Sarah, daughter of Rabbi Yitzchok Friedman of Buhuși, a town in the Kingdom of Romania. He subsequently settled among the Jewish community in Buhuşi for many years, until his father-in-law decided that the time was ripe for him to become a rebbe himself.

Nearing forty years of age, Reb Shalom was sent to the village of Răducani (Radukan), presently part of Lunca Banului, Vaslui County. He was well received there, and stayed for more than 13 years. The spread of the Haskalah movement into the area and the opening of a school by them in 1909 resulted in Reb Shalom threatening to leave Răducani unless the school was closed. After his threats were not taken seriously, he left to settle in nearby Vaslui (Vasloi), where a large court and synagogue were built for him.

Reb Shalom was among the few gedolim in Romania that fought against Zionism. Many attempts were made to convince him of the advantages of the establishment of a Jewish state in Palestine. Once, the head of the local Zionist movement asked Reb Shalom why he was opposed. He took out a map of the Middle East and showed it to the man saying: "Look, here is Syria, here is Egypt and Iraq. More than one hundred million Arabs live in these countries and you think you will be able to live in peace? I am telling you that they will fight against the Jews until the messiah will come and redeem us."

On the 24 Av, 1939, Reb Shalom died. His only son Reb Chaim Dov assumed his father position and left Romania in 1950 for Israel, where he died in 1957. He was succeeded by his son Reb Yaakov Shlomo who was in turn succeeded by his son the present Rebbe of Vasloi, Reb Avrahom Shimshon Shalom who lives in Bnei Brak.

The current Rebbe of Vasloi has his Synagogue and Beit Midrash in Tel Aviv, where an eclectic group of congregants gather to pray and study.

References
 Yisroel Friedman, The Golden Dynasty, Girsa Ltd, Jerusalem, 1997.

External links
The Vasloier Rebbe: Reb Sholom Halpern, zt'l

Hasidic dynasties
Hasidic Judaism in Israel
Hasidic Judaism in Romania
Vasloi
Vaslui